The 2013–14 Liga EBA season was the 20th edition of the Liga EBA. This is the fourth division of Spanish basketball. Four teams will be promoted to LEB Plata. The regular season started in October 2013 and finished in March 2014. Promotion playoffs to LEB Plata were in April 2014.

Format

Regular season
Teams were divided in five groups by geographical criteria. Groups A and E were also divided in two:
Sub-group A-A: Cantabria, Basque Country, La Rioja and Castile and León.
Sub-group A-B: Galicia, Asturias and Castile and León.
Group B: Community of Madrid, Castile-La Mancha and Canary Islands.
Group C: Catalonia and Aragón.
Group D: Andalusia, Extremadura and Melilla.
Sub-group E-A: Valencian Community and Region of Murcia.
Sub-group E-B: Balearic Islands.

Final play-off
The three best teams of each group and the fourth of Group A (champion of the previous season) played the promotion playoffs. From these 16 teams, only four promoted to LEB Plata. The winner of each group could organize a group stage.

The final promotion playoffs were played round-robin format in groups of four teams where the first qualified of each group promoted to LEB Plata.

League table

Group A

Sub-group A-A

|}

Sub-group A-B

|}

Group A final standings

Group B

|}

Group C

|}

Group D

|}

Group E

Sub-group E-A

|}

Sub-group E-B

|}

Qualification group

|}

Relegation group

|}

Promotion playoffs
The 16 qualified teams will be divided in four groups of four teams. The first qualified teams will host the groups, played with a round-robin format. They will be played from 24 to 26 May 2014.

The winner of each group will promote to LEB Plata.

Group 1 – Valladolid

Group 2 – Santa Cruz de Tenerife

Group 3 – Sabadell

Group 4 – Morón de la Frontera

Final standings

External links
Liga EBA at FEB.es

Liga EBA seasons
EBA